Heterallactis stenochrysa is a moth of the family Erebidae. It was described by Alfred Jefferis Turner in 1940. It is found in Queensland, Australia.

References

Nudariina
Moths described in 1940